Khoj is a 1989 Bollywood mystery thriller directed by Keshu Ramsay, starring Rishi Kapoor, Naseeruddin Shah, Kimi Katkar in lead roles. This movie was released on 21 July 1989 and is based on the British movie Chase a Crooked Shadow (1957), which was an inspiration for the Bengali thriller Sesh Anka and One of My Wives Is Missing (TV Movie 1976). The film was remade in Telugu as Police Report and in Kannada as Agni Sakshi.

Synopsis
Ravi Kapoor (Rishi Kapoor) and his wife Anita are holidaying in Kathmandu. One night, Anita  disappears suddenly. Ravi goes searching her everywhere but in vain. He then files a police report about her missing status and Inspector Balveer Singh (Naseeruddin Shah) begins the search for her. The next day, Ravi gets a call from Father Anthony (Danny Denzongpa) saying that his missing wife is with him in the church, but when Ravi meets her, he claims that the woman is not his wife.

Inspector Balveer finds all the evidence is against Ravi, despite his attempts to prove otherwise. Who is this mysterious woman and why is she claiming to be Ravi's  wife?

Cast
Rishi Kapoor as Ravi Kapoor
Naseeruddin Shah as Inspector Balveer Singh
Kimi Katkar as Anita Kapoor
Satish Shah as Bobby Singh / Dobby Singh (Double Role) 
Danny Denzongpa as Father Anthony
Om Shivpuri as Dr. Saxena
Sudha Shivpuri as Sudha Rana
Beena Banerjee as Gulabo Singh 
Prema Narayan as Dancer in song "Aaj Ki Biwi"
Huma Khan as Dancer in song "Bolo Bolo"

Soundtrack

References

External links
 

1989 films
Films scored by Bappi Lahiri
1980s Hindi-language films
Indian mystery thriller films
Hindi remakes of Bengali films
Indian remakes of British films
Films directed by Keshu Ramsay
1980s mystery thriller films
Films set in Nepal
Films shot in Kathmandu
Films shot in Nepal